Mount Ickes is a  mountain summit located west of the crest of the Sierra Nevada mountain range, in Fresno County of northern California, United States. Other nearby peaks include Crater Mountain  to the southeast, Striped Mountain  to the northeast, Arrow Peak,  to the west, and Mount Ruskin  to the northwest. Mount Ickes ranks as the 159th highest summit in California. Topographic relief is significant as the north aspect rises  in 2.5 miles. The approach to this remote peak is made via the John Muir Trail which passes to the east of the mountain. The mountain's name was officially adopted in 1964 by the United States Board on Geographic Names to honor Harold L. Ickes (1874–1952), who was responsible for implementing much of President Franklin D. Roosevelt's New Deal as Secretary of the Interior from 1933 to 1946 and was instrumental in establishing Kings Canyon National Park.

Climate
According to the Köppen climate classification system, Mount Ickes is located in an alpine climate zone. Most weather fronts originate in the Pacific Ocean, and travel east toward the Sierra Nevada mountains. As fronts approach, they are forced upward by the peaks, causing them to drop their moisture in the form of rain or snowfall onto the range (orographic lift). Precipitation runoff from the mountain drains into tributaries of the South Fork Kings River.

See also

 List of mountain peaks of California

References

External links

 Weather forecast: Mount Ickes

Mountains of Fresno County, California
Mountains of Kings Canyon National Park
North American 3000 m summits
Mountains of Northern California
Sierra Nevada (United States)